Fried is a Yiddish-language surname that is exclusively Ashkenazic Jewish and a German-language surname of German ancestry.

 Alfred Hermann Fried, Austrian Jewish pacifist, publicist, journalist,  Nobel Peace Prize winner in 1911
 Avraham Fried, popular musical entertainer in the Orthodox Jewish community
 Bradley Fried, British businessman
 Charles Fried, conservative American jurist and lawyer
 Daisy Fried, American poet
 Daniel Fried, American career diplomat, ambassador and Special Envoy
 David L. Fried, scientist, best known for his contributions to optics
 Erich Fried, poet known for his political-minded poetry
 Eugen Fried, Slovak communist who played a leading role in the French Communist Party
 Ferdinand Fried, the pen-name of Ferdinand Zimmermann (German economist and writer)
 George Fried, American sea captain
 Gerald Fried (1928–2023), American composer
 Heinrich Jakob Fried, German painter
 Ina Fried, senior editor for All Things Digital
 Jake Fried, artist and animator
 Johann Jakob Fried, German obstetrician
 Max Fried (born 1994), American baseball pitcher for the Atlanta Braves
 Morton Fried, a professor of anthropology
 Michael Fried (art critic), Modernist art critic and art historian
 Nicolás Alejandro Massú Fried (born 1979), Chilean Olympic champion tennis player
 Nikki Fried (born 1977), American politician
 Norbert Fried, Czech writer, journalist and diplomat
 Oskar Fried, German conductor and composer
 Sam Bankman-Fried (born 1992), American businessman, co-founder of cryptocurrency exchange FTX
 Volker Fried,  former field hockey player from West Germany

See also
 Frid
 Fried's rule

References

German-language surnames
Jewish surnames
Yiddish-language surnames